Poecilopompilus is a fossorial genus of the family Pomplidae found in the New World.  The main prey of these wasps are spiders of the family Araneidae.

Species
There are 37 currently recognised species in Poecilopompilus. These include:

Poecilopompilus algidus (Smith, 1855)
Poecilopompilus annulatus (Fabricius, 1793)
Poecilopompilus apicalis (Banks, 1947)
Poecilopompilus autrani (Holmberg)
Poecilopompilus badius Evans, 1966
Poecilopompilus costatus (Taschenberg)
Poecilopompilus decedens (Smith, 1873)
Poecilopompilus eurymelus (Banks, 1947)
Poecilopompilus exquisitus (Fox)
Poecilopompilus familiaris (Smith)
Poecilopompilus flavopictus(Smith)
Poecilopompilus interruptus (Say, 1835)
Poecilopompilus maculifrons (Smith, 1873)
Poecilopompilus mixtus (Fabricius, 1798)
Poecilopompilus polistoides  (Smith)
Poecilopompilus rubricatus (Smith, 1879)
Poecilopompilus ventralis (Banks, 1947)

References